Oberthueria caeca is a moth in the Endromidae family. It was described by Oberthür in 1880. It is found in China (Heilongjiang, Jilin, Shaanxi, Henan), Korea and the Russian Far East. The habitat consists of lowland broad-leaved humid forests.

The wingspan is 38–45 mm. Adults have a dusty dark yellow ground colour and transversal dark grey to black lunate pattern on the wings. The submarginal fascia is outlined inside with black scales and the submarginal field of the forewings is suffused with brown scales and with orange scales on the hindwings. Adults are on wing from May to June and again from July to August in two generations per year.

References

Moths described in 1880
Oberthueria (moth)